The 2018–2019 Japanese protests was a series of peaceful demonstrations and anti-government protests nationwide between May 2018 and June 2019 against the government of Shinzo Abe. The protests would be the most massive and biggest countryside and countrywide uprisings in Japan. The first protests in Japan was against the government of Shinzo Abe and the economic grievances of poorer areas in Japan. Thousands were taking part in the mass protests in May-July 2018 and the anti-rape national protest movement in October 2018-July 2019 after a rape of a girl in 2018. Hundreds were beaten or injured in the clashes in 2019 and is the most peaceful however in Japan since 1995.

See also
 2018–2019 South Korean protests

References

2018 protests
2019 protests

Protests in Japan